The Critérium International de Sétif was a one-day cycling race held in Algeria, between 2014 and 2016. It was held as part of the UCI Africa Tour, rated 1.2.

Winners

References

Cycle races in Algeria
2014 establishments in Algeria
Recurring sporting events established in 2014
2016 disestablishments in Algeria
Recurring sporting events disestablished in 2016
Sétif Province
UCI Africa Tour races